German submarine U-1276 was a Type VIIC/41 U-boat of Nazi Germany's Kriegsmarine, built for service during World War II. She was laid down at Bremer Vulkan of Bremen-Vegesack on 13 July 1943. She was commissioned  6 April 1944 with Oberleutnant zur See Karl-Heinz Wendt in command. U-1276 was equipped with a submarine snorkel (underwater-breathing apparatus) when she sailed on her last cruise.

Design
German Type VIIC/41 submarines were preceded by the heavier Type VIIC submarines. U-1276 had a displacement of  when at the surface and  while submerged. She had two shafts and two  propellers.

U-1276 was fitted with five  torpedo tubes (four fitted at the bow and one at the stern), fourteen torpedoes, one  SK C/35 naval gun, (220 rounds), one  Flak M42 and two  C/30 anti-aircraft guns. The boat had a complement of between forty-four and sixty.

Service history
At 11:45 on 20 February 1945, U-1276 sank , (Lt. Cdr. R.A. Howell, RNVR in command), a  escorting convoy HX 337. The commander, three officers and 56 ratings were lost. Three officers and 31 ratings were rescued. (Lt. Cdr. N. Scott-Elliot, DSC, RN in command), which was part of the same convoy, then sank U-1276 by depth charges, off Waterford, Ireland at position . All hands aboard the U-boat (49) were lost.

Post war

Summary of raiding history

See also
 Battle of the Atlantic

References

Notes

Citations

Bibliography

External links

German Type VIIC/41 submarines
U-boats commissioned in 1944
U-boats sunk in 1945
World War II submarines of Germany
World War II shipwrecks in the Celtic Sea
1944 ships
Ships built in Bremen (state)
U-boats sunk by depth charges
U-boats sunk by British warships
Ships lost with all hands
Maritime incidents in February 1945